Space Revolver is the fifth studio album by the progressive rock band The Flower Kings, released on 4 July 2000.

Track listing

Japanese version
The Japanese release contains an additional disc:

Personnel
Roine Stolt - vocals, guitar, bass guitar
Tomas Bodin - piano, organ, synthesizer, Mellotron
Hasse Fröberg - vocals, acoustic guitar
Jonas Reingold - bass guitar
Jaime Salazar - drums
with
Hasse Bruniusson - mallet percussion, vocals
Ulf Wallander - soprano saxophone

References

2000 albums
The Flower Kings albums
Century Media Records albums